Eudice Shapiro  (1914–2007) was a violinist, chamber musician and violin professor.

Shapiro was born in Buffalo, New York, in 1914.

Education
Shapiro began studying violin with her father when she was 5, won her first prize when she was 10 and began her solo career with the Buffalo Philharmonic when she was 12.
She studied with Gustave Tinlot at the Eastman School of Music in Rochester, New York, and with Efrem Zimbalist at the Curtis Institute of Music in Philadelphia.

Music career
She moved to Los Angeles in 1941 to begin playing in Hollywood studios for Paramount, United Artists and RKO. 
She was the first female concertmaster in any studio orchestra, beginning at RKO and Paramount.

Career as educator 
She was on the University of Southern California faculty starting in 1956.

Later life
She died Sept. 17, 2007.

References

 Eudice Shapiro : A Life in Music, 50 Years of Teaching At USC, Evan Calbi, Publisher: USC / Thornton School of Music (2006), ASIN: B001KSRDRO
 A Windfall of Musicians, Dorothy Lamb Crawford, Yale University Press, 2009, 

American violinists
Jewish American musicians
University of Southern California faculty
Eastman School of Music alumni
Curtis Institute of Music alumni
1914 births
2007 deaths
Musicians from Buffalo, New York
20th-century American Jews
21st-century American Jews